Adenodolichos acutifoliolatus is a plant in the legume family Fabaceae, native to Tanzania.

Description
Inflorescences have flowers featuring mauve petals.

Distribution and habitat
Adenodolichos acutifoliolatus is endemic to Tanzania.

References

acutifoliolatus
Endemic flora of Tanzania
Plants described in 1971
Taxa named by Bernard Verdcourt